Nathaniel Stephen Appleby (1811–1890) was an Ontario businessman and political figure. He represented Hastings East in the Legislative Assembly of Ontario as an independent Conservative from 1875 to 1883.

He was born in Tyendinaga, Upper Canada in 1820, the son of Thomas Dorland Appleby, and educated in Belleville, Ontario. He operated flour mills near Shannonville, Ontario. In 1842, he married Sarah Maria Lewis. Appleby was reeve for Tyendinaga Township from 1851 to 1870 and warden for Hastings County from 1858 to 1862. He also served as justice of the peace. He was defeated by William Parker Hudson for the Hastings East seat in 1883.

External links 
The Canadian parliamentary companion and annual register, 1878

1811 births
1890 deaths
Mayors of places in Ontario
People from Hastings County
People from Prince Edward County, Ontario
Progressive Conservative Party of Ontario MPPs